The Asmara President's Office is the building, in Italian neoclassical style, where the President of Eritrea lives and rules the country.

History 
The former Italian government's palace was built in 1897 by Ferdinando Martini, the first Italian governor of Eritrea. The Italian government wanted to create in Asmara (just made capital of Eritrea in place of Massawa)an impressive building, from where the Italian governors could show the dedication of the Kingdom of Italy to the "Colonia primogenita" (first daughter-colony) as Eritrea was called.

During the Italian Empire the building was improved as the center of the "Governatorato dell'Eritrea"; it was heavily damaged during World War II and then converted into a National Museum by the Ethiopian authorities in the 1950s.

Today, it is the office of the President of Eritrea, Isaias Afewerki.

Structure 
Governor Ferdinando Martini wanted a structure with colonnades at the entrance in neoclassical style, surrounded by a park with lush vegetation. In his opinion the building would be the biggest and most beautiful in Asmara, the newly declared capital of the Italian colony in 1897.

The interior was decorated with Italian marble and furniture brought from Italy and France. The main hall was decorated with typical Renaissance stairs toward the projected second floor. The main doors were specially crafted with wood from Brazil.

Notes

See also 
 Asmara
 Italian Eritrea
 Italian Empire

Buildings and structures in Asmara
Presidential residences
Government buildings completed in 1897
Houses completed in 1897
Italian East Africa
Official residences in Eritrea

hr:Predsjednička palača (Asmara)